The Fiszor is a river of Wyszków County in the Masovian Voivodeship of eastern central Poland, a left tributary of the Bug River. It is 27.16 kilometres (16.88 mi) long and flows through Choszczowe, Mostówka, in the vicinity of Niegów and the village of Młynarze in Gmina Wyszków district.

References

Rivers of Masovian Voivodeship